Mansa Airport  is an airport serving Mansa, a city in the Luapula Province in Zambia.

The Mansa non-directional beacon (Ident: MA) is located on the field.

See also

Transport in Zambia
List of airports in Zambia

References

External links
OpenStreetMap - Mansa Airport
SkyVector - Mansa Airport

Airports in Zambia
Buildings and structures in Western Province, Zambia